The 1796 English cricket season was the 25th in which matches have been awarded retrospective first-class cricket status and the tenth after the foundation of the Marylebone Cricket Club. The season saw seven top-class matches played in the country.

Matches 
A total of seven top-class matches were played during the season, all bar one of which included a team playing under the name of Kent, Middlesex or Surrey.

The season saw the last match between two sides named for counties until 1825. It also saw the completion of a first-class match which had been begun the following year: a match between teams organised by the Earl of Winchilsea and Richard Leigh, which began on 23 July 1795 and was completed on 28 June 1796 before a match between an England side and a Surrey and Kent XI began on the same day, with a number of players appearing in both matches.

First mentions
Players who made their first-class cricket debuts in 1796 included:
 Denzil Onslow
 Robert Ayling
 George Ring

References

Further reading
 
 
 
 

1796 in English cricket
English cricket seasons in the 18th century